This is a list of members of the Australian Senate from 1920 to 1923. Half of its members were elected at the 5 May 1917 election and had terms starting on 1 July 1917 and finishing on 30 June 1923; the other half were elected at the 13 December 1919 election and had terms starting on 1 July 1920 and finishing on 30 June 1926.

Notes

References

Members of Australian parliaments by term
20th-century Australian politicians
Australian Senate lists